Garga is a genus of skippers (butterfly) in the family Hesperiidae.

References
Natural History Museum Lepidoptera genus database

Hesperiidae
Hesperiidae genera